This is a list of George Floyd protests in Kansas, United States. Protests occurred in at least fifteen various communities in the state through July 2020.

Locations

Coffeyville 
About 200 people attended a protest on the campus of Coffeyville Community College on June 4.

Derby 
On June 3, around 150 people held a peaceful protest at the intersection of Madison and Rock.

Fort Scott 
On May 31, several people protested at the intersection of National Avenue and U.S. Highway 69, and the following day a larger protest was held on the front steps of Memorial Hall.

Great Bend 
On June 1, a group of young people organized a protest at the courthouse square.

Hays 
On May 31, around 120 people gathered near 27th and Vine St. for a peaceful protest.

Hutchinson 
On May 31, several hundred people gathered in front of the court house for a peaceful protest.

Lawrence 
On May 31, several hundreds of people peacefully marched down Massachusetts Street.

Leavenworth 
On June 6, residents gathered for a Unity Walk that started at the Richard Allen Cultural Center and ended at Bob Dougherty Park.

Kansas City 
On May 30 and 31 protests took place in Kansas City, Kansas as well as nearby Kansas City, Missouri. As of June 7, protesters had been gathering in Kansas for ten consecutive days.

Manhattan 
On May 30, protesters marched down Bluemont Avenue. A second protest at Triangle Park in Aggieville occurred June 1.

Olathe 
On June 5, residents gathered at Olathe City Hall to remember George Floyd. A second protest took place on June 6 at the intersection of Santa Fe and Mur-Len Roads in honor of George Floyd.

Overland Park 
A small group of people protested on the side of a street on July 24, and four people were arrested. In response, a second protest was held outside of the Overland Park mayor's home, this one with around 70 demonstrators.

Parsons 
On June 6, the community of Parsons held a peaceful protest and prayer vigil.

Topeka 
On May 30, about 500 people peacefully protested in front of the Kansas State Capitol.

Wichita 
On May 30, nearly two thousand peaceful protesters marched around parts of Wichita before dispersing by the end of the day. Two more protests were held on June 2. The first began at 7:00 p.m. as demonstrators gathered at 21st and Maize in northwest Wichita and chanted peacefully. After four hours later, a firework mortar exploded and police arrived, declaring the protest an unlawful assembly. The crowd dispersed without any further violence. The second protest took place at 21st and Arkansas, where riot police and two armed counterprotesters stood by as protesters chanted against police violence. At 11:30 p.m., dozens of protesters stormed and looted a QuikTrip store, and police responded by declaring the protest an unlawful assembly and ordering the protesters to leave. Flash grenades and tear gas were deployed on looters and five arrests were made. Following the protest, city officials considered implementing a city-wide curfew, but ultimately decided not to.

Winfield 
On May 30, twenty-five people protested in Winfield, and a second protest was organized for Friday June 5. Reportedly many black people stayed home out of fear.

References 

2020 in Kansas
Events in Kansas
Kansas
Riots and civil disorder in Kansas
June 2020 events in the United States
May 2020 events in the United States